Michael Venturi (born 23 January 1999) is an Italian football player. He plays for Cosenza.

Club career
He made his professional Serie C debut for Fermana on 25 September 2019 in a game against Südtirol.

On 10 August 2021, he signed a three-year contract with Serie B club Cosenza. He made his Serie B debut for Cosenza on 22 August 2021 against Ascoli.

References

External links
 
 

1999 births
Sportspeople from Rimini
Living people
Italian footballers
Association football defenders
A.C. Carpi players
A.C. Gozzano players
Fermana F.C. players
Cosenza Calcio players
Serie D players
Serie C players
Serie B players
Footballers from Emilia-Romagna